The Other Side is an acoustic EP by American rock band Godsmack, released on March 16, 2004. It includes several previously released songs re-recorded as acoustic versions, as well as three new acoustic tracks.

One new song, "Touché", featured Godsmack's first guitarist, Lee Richards, as well as John Kosco, who were at that time in the now defunct band Dropbox. The other two new acoustic tracks are "Running Blind" and "Voices" which are old songs that vocalist Sully Erna wrote but never recorded.

The song "Asleep" is actually an acoustic, shorter and calmer version of "Awake" from the band's second album, Awake.

Recording
According to Sully Erna, the band decided to do an acoustic record because they have always messed around with acoustic versions of their music and gotten great reactions to it. "Reworking the songs this way shows a different side of the band."

The Other Side was recorded in a Hawaiian studio with producer David Bottrill, who has worked with the group on "I Stand Alone", and on their third studio album, Faceless.

Commercial performance
The Other Side debuted at number five on the Billboard 200, selling 98,000 copies in its first week, and the album would go on to sell over half million copies in the United States. The album has been certified Gold by the Recording Industry Association of America (RIAA), with excess sales of 500,000 copies.

Track listing

Personnel
 Sully Erna – acoustic guitar, vocals, producer
 Tony Rombola – acoustic guitar, backing vocalist
 Robbie Merrill – bass
 Shannon Larkin – drums, percussion
David Bottrill – mixing
P. R. Brown – art direction, design, cover photo
Troy Gonzalez – assistant
Sherline Hall – assistant
Kent Hertz – engineer
Dave Homcy – photography
John Kosco – guest appearance, vocals
Bob Ludwig – mastering
Lee Richards – guest appearance, guitar
Ben Sanders – assistant
Kurt Schneck – assistant
Kevin Sheehy – assistant

Charts

Weekly charts

Year-end charts

Singles

Certifications

References

2004 EPs
Godsmack albums
Hard rock EPs
Republic Records EPs
Universal Records EPs